Cattle Hill is a 2018 Norwegian animated comedy film directed by Lise I. Osvoll from a script by Anne Elvedal. Produced by Qvisten Animation in co-production with The Lipp and Vigmostad & Bjørke, the film is based on the titular attraction in Kristiansand Zoo and Amusement Park in Norway. It was released in Norway on 19 October 2018 and in the UK on 22 November 2019, and had a worldwide gross of $1,330,576.

Premise 
The young calf Klara dreams of becoming a famous musician. One day, she is invited to visit her father Mosk the ox at his farm, whom she has not seen for many years, believing that he is a big rock star. However, when she arrives, she finds out that he is actually a financially troubled farmer who is about to lose his farm.

Voice cast 
 Henriette Faye-Schjøll as Kalven Klara
 Sigrid Bonde Tusvik as Kari, Klara's mother
 Fridtjov Såheim as Mosk, Klara's father
 Bjarte Tjøstheim as Fugleskremselet Fobetron
 Mats Eldøen as Guttegeiten Gaute
 Marit A. Andreassen as Høna Chickolina
 Oda Osvoll Avatsmark as Meitemarken Rosa
 Jan Martin Johnsen as Sauen Bærnt
 Charlotte Frogner as Grisen Pauline
 Unge Ferrari as Zebra twin 1
 Arif as Zebra twin 2

Release 
The film was released in Norway on 19 October 2018, where it grossed $1,137,978. It was released in the UK on 22 November 2019 and grossed $8,366, adding to a worldwide total of $1,330,576.

The film received a nomination for the Amanda Award for Best Children's Film in 2019.

Sequel 
A sequel, titled Christmas at Cattle Hill (Jul på KuToppen) was released on 6 November 2020.

See also 
List of Norwegian films of the 2010s

References

Further reading 
Iversen, Gunnar (10 January 2020) Analysen: KuToppen (2018). (in Norwegian). .

External links 

Films directed by Rasmus A. Sivertsen
2018 films
2010s Norwegian-language films